Tolaasin, a toxic secretion by Pseudomonas tolaasii, is the cause of bacterial brown blotch disease of edible mushrooms.  Tolaasin is a 1985 Da lipodepsipeptide non-host specific toxin.  In addition to forming an amphipathic left handed alpha-helix in a hydrophobic environment, the toxin has been shown to form Zn2+-sensitive voltage-gated ion channels in planar lipid bilayers and to catalyze erythrocyte lysis by a colloid osmotic mechanism.  At high concentrations, tolaasin acts as a detergent that is able to directly dissolve eukaryotic membranes.[1]

References

Peptides
Bacterial toxins